Loveday Elizabeth Trevenen Jenkin is a British politician, biologist and language campaigner. She has been a member of Cornwall Council since 2011, and currently serves as councillor for Crowan, Sithney and Wendron.

Biography
Jenkin is the daughter of Richard Jenkin and Ann Trevenen Jenkin, key figures in Cornish nationalist political party Mebyon Kernow. She attended Helston grammar school, later Helston comprehensive. Jenkin studied botany and biochemistry at Cardiff University and gained a doctorate in plant biochemistry the University of Cambridge. During the late 1980s and early 90s, she worked as education officer for Cornwall Wildlife Trust.

In 1990, she was elected as leader of Mebyon Kernow, then at a low ebb.  She served until 1997, focusing on reviving the party's electoral performance.  She stood as the party's candidate for Cornwall and West Plymouth at the 1994 European election, taking 1.5% of the vote.  Soon after, she was elected to Kerrier District Council, representing the Crowan district until the council was merged into Cornwall Council, a unitary authority.

She subsequently stood, unsuccessfully, for Parliament on a number of occasions. At the 2010 general election, Jenkin stood in Camborne and Redruth, taking 775 votes, coming fifth of seven candidates. At the 2015 general election, Jenkin again stood in Camborne and Redruth, taking 897 votes, giving her the last place of six candidates standing, but increasing her vote total and also her percentage of votes cast (+0.2%).

Jenkin was elected to Cornwall Council in a 2011 by-election, representing the Wendron district, and was subsequently re-elected in 2013 and 2017 (for the Crowan and Wendron division and in 2021 (for the Crowan, Sithney and Wendron division. In 2014, Jenkin was selected by Mebyon Kernow to represent the party at the 2015 General Elections.

Jenkin was a lecturer for the University of Exeter at the Camborne School of Mines, where she undertook studies into Japanese knotweed.  She is also a bard of Gorsedh Kernow (with the name , or 'Daughter of the Country' in English), has served as Cornwall's Great Trees Officer for the National Trust, and chairs the Cornish Language Fellowship.

Personal life 
Jenkin has two children, who were brought up speaking Cornish as their first language. Jenkin is a member of Akademi Kernewek, the official body responsible for corpus planning for the Cornish language, serving on the terminology panel and the Cornish language place-names and signage panel.

References

Year of birth missing (living people)
Living people
Alumni of Cardiff University
Alumni of the University of Cambridge
Academics of the University of Exeter
Politicians from Cornwall
Bards of Gorsedh Kernow
Cornish language
Cornish-speaking people
Cornish nationalists
Mebyon Kernow politicians
Leaders of political parties in the United Kingdom
21st-century English politicians
Women councillors in England
Members of Cornwall Council